Pont-sur-Madon is a commune in the Vosges department in Grand Est in northeastern France.

Inhabitants are called Madipontains.

Geography
The river Madon flows through the commune, and the bridge included in the name Pont-sur-Madon (Bridge over the Madon) is still in place.

See also
Communes of the Vosges department

References

Communes of Vosges (department)